Anjuman Ara Shilpi is a Bangladeshi film and television actress. Her first film, Banglar Commando, was released on 5 May 1995. She starred in 36 films between 1995 and 2000. After 2000, she left the film industry.

Biography 
Shilpi grew up in Dhaka. Her maternal uncle helped her get on stage in Narayanganj.

Her first film acting role was in Nag Nortoki. However, her first released film was Bangla Commando which was released on 5 May 1995. According to The Daily Ittefaq, her performance opposite Salman Shah in the 1996 romance  made her famous. She withdrew from making films in 2000. The last films of hers to be released were Razzak's Premer Naam Bedona and Dewan Nazrul's Sujon Bondhu.

She had made her television debut in the drama Amrai, directed by Abdullah Al Mamun. She continued working in TV dramas irregularly until 2013.

Shilpi married businessman Alamgir Iqbal in 2011. She moved to the United States when their son was born in 2012. Two years later they had a daughter.

Filmography

References

External links
 

Bangladeshi film actresses
20th-century Bangladeshi actresses
Year of birth missing (living people)
Living people
Best Supporting Actress Bachsas Award winners